Andy Grammer is the debut album from American recording artist Andy Grammer. It was released on June 14, 2011, via S-Curve Records. The album was preceded by the platinum-certified single "Keep Your Head Up", which was released on November 15, 2010.

It was produced by Matt Wallace (Maroon 5), Matt Radosevich, Dave Katz, and Sam Hollander (Gym Class Heroes), and peaked at #105 on the US Billboard 200 chart as well as #1 on the Billboard Heatseekers Albums chart.

Background
Grammer was "fully involved in the creative process" of the album. He prefers to write songs on his own, but making the album allowed him to work with other writers as well.

Singles
"Keep Your Head Up" was released in February 2011, and reached #53 on the Billboard Hot 100. The music video for the single gained considerable buzz due to a "Choose Your Own Adventure"-esque option with VEVO. The song was later certified platinum by RIAA. It was later featured in the 2012 film Pitch Perfect.

The album's second single was "Fine by Me" was released in December 2011, and peaked at #84 on the Billboard Hot 100 respectively. with the music video premiering in February 2012.

The third single "Miss Me" was released to Adult Contemporary stations only, with a music video premiering on September 8, 2012.

Critical reception

William Ruhlmann, of Allmusic, rated the album with three and a half stars out of five. Ruhlmann comments that the music lightly borrows from hip-hop music and has a rap music influence. He also said that Grammer's music leans toward a female audience, usually directing himself to a significant other and singing words of encouragement and affection. Tanner Stransky gave the album a B from a scale of A+ to E, stating that the album sounded "like a mash-up of Jason Mraz, Michael Bublé, and John Legend. It's all easily listenable, if scarcely original."

Track listing

Chart performance

References

2011 debut albums
Andy Grammer albums
S-Curve Records albums